514th may refer to:

514th Air Defense Group, disbanded United States Air Force (USAF) organization
514th Air Mobility Wing, wing of the United States Air Force based out of Joint Base McGuire-Dix-Lakehurst, New Jersey
514th Fighter-Interceptor Squadron, inactive United States Air Force unit
514th Flight Test Squadron (514 FLTS), part of the Ogden Air Logistics Center based at Hill Air Force Base, Utah
514th Troop Carrier Group or 514th Operations Group, United States Air Force Reserve unit, assigned to the 514th Air Mobility Wing

See also
514 (number)
514, the year 514 (DXIV) of the Julian calendar
514 BC